Tmolus echion, the red-spotted hairstreak or larger lantana butterfly, is a butterfly in the family Lycaenidae. It is found from Brazil, north to Sinaloa and Tamaulipas in Mexico. Rare strays can be found in southern Texas. It was introduced to Hawaii in 1902 to control lantana.

The wingspan is 22–32 mm. Adults are on wing in May in southern Texas and year-round in Hawaii and Mexico. Adults feed on flower nectar.

The larvae feed on various tropical plants including verbena, mint and potato species.

Subspecies
Tmolus echion echion
Tmolus echion echiolus (Draudt, 1920) (Mexico)

External links
Nearctica

Eumaeini
Butterflies of North America
Lycaenidae of South America
Taxa named by Carl Linnaeus
Butterflies described in 1767